Keenin Lesch (born 13 March 1981) is a South African association football midfielder who has coached National First Division club Vasco da Gama.

References

1981 births
Living people
Sportspeople from Cape Town
Cape Coloureds
South African soccer players
Association football midfielders
Vasco da Gama (South Africa) players
Santos F.C. (South Africa) players
Milano United F.C. players
South African soccer managers